Error rate, meaning the frequency of errors, can have the following uses:
Bayes error rate
Bit error rate
Per-comparison error rate
Residual bit error rate
Soft error rate
Technique for human error-rate prediction
Viterbi error rate
Word error rate

See also
Failure rate

Rates